Banākat, Banākath, Fanākat, or Fanākath was a town on the upper Syr Darya in Transoxiana (present-day Tajikistan, Central Asia).

The second part of these names, kat or kath, is an Eastern Iranian (Soghdian) compound meaning town. Its other forms are kāt, kāth, kant, kand as in Samarkand and Chāchkand (now Tashkent). It is similar to the Persian suffix '-kada'.

Banākat was located near Khujand in present-day Tajikistan. At the time of his invasion, Chingis Khan divided his army into four: 
 one part under Jochi to capture cities around Syr Darya including Khujand and Banākat
 one part under Chagatai and Ögedei to capture Otrar
 two other parts under Tolui and himself to capture Samarkand.

This town was later rebuilt by Timur (Tamerlane) and renamed Shahrukhiya after his son Shahrukh.

Famous people from Banakat 

There are several Persians called Banākati (i.e., of or related to Banākat), some of them born in Banākat and some born elsewhere:

 Amir (meaning minister) Ahmad Banākati: (killed 1282 CE / 681 AH), the finance minister and vizier of Qubilai Khan
 Mohammad Banākati (in full: Tājeddin Abulfazl Mohammad ibn Mohammad Banākati, died 1283 CE / 682 AH): a Persian religious scholar and father of Davoud and Ali Banākati (see below).
 Abu Sulayman Banakati (died 1330): Persian  poet and historian who wrote Rawzat al-Ulu al-Albāb fi Ma'rifat Tawārikh al-Akābir wa al-Ansāb ( Garden of the Learned to Know the History of Great Men and Genealogy). This book is also known as Tārikh-i Banākati. Davoud Banākati wrote this book in 1317 CE / 717 AH for Abu Said Bahatur.  He was poet laureate (malek ol-shoara) of Ghazan Khan court.
 Ali Banākati (in full: Sayyid Nizāmeddin Ali ibn Mohammad Banākati, died 1299 CE / 699 AH): a great mystic and Sufi from Tabriz, brother of Davoud Banākati.
 Nāsekh Banākati (in full: Abul-Mozaffar Qutbeddin Ahmad ibn Mahmoud ibn Abu-Bakr, died after 1272 CE / 671 AH) a well-known and high-quality copyist and calligrapher who was contemporary with Khwaja Nasireddin Tusi and copied several of his works and met him in Maragha observatory.

References 
 Related entries in Dehkhoda Dictionary of Persian language (in Persian) online site
 Hossein Hasan-Nejad, "Introduction and review of Banākati History " in Journal of Studies in History (Majalleh Tārikh-pezhuhi) (in Persian), 2002 CE/1381 AH.

Former populated places in Tajikistan
Populated places in Central Asia